Pierre Jubinville (born August 5, 1960, in Ottawa, Ontario) is a Canadian-born Paraguayan Roman Catholic bishop.

Education 
In 2012, he took courses in religious studies at the Institut Catholique de Paris.

Career

Priesthood 
Pierre was ordained and appointed as a priest by Bishop Roger Ebacher in 1988. Roger described Jubinville as a “very bright poet". He served in Mexico, then Lima, Paraguay, Since 2012 he has been in Rome as First General Assistant in the Congregation of the Holy Spirit.

As a Bishop 
Jubinville was appointed bishop of the Roman Catholic Diocese of San Pedro, Paraguay on November 6, 2013.

References 

1960 births
Living people
Clergy from Ottawa
20th-century Canadian Roman Catholic priests
21st-century Roman Catholic bishops in Paraguay
Roman Catholic bishops of San Pedro